Taiynsha (Taiynşa), known as Krasnoarmeysk between 1962 and 1997, is a city and the administrative center of Taiynsha District in North Kazakhstan Region of Kazakhstan (KATO code - 596020100). Population:

Geography

References

Populated places in North Kazakhstan Region